The women's 60 kg (132 lbs) Semi-Contact category at the W.A.K.O. World Championships 2007 in Coimbra was the third lightest of the female Light-Contact tournaments being the equivalent of the middleweight division when compared to Full-Contact's weight classes. There were fifteen women from three continents (Europe, Africa and North America) taking part in the competition.  Each of the matches was three rounds of two minutes each and were fought under Semi-Contact rules.

As there were too few women for a sixteen-person tournament, one of the women had a bye through to the quarter final stage.  The tournament gold medallist was the Italian Gloria De Bei who defeated Brit Lisa Boardman in the final by points decision.  Pole Emilia Szablowska and 2007 Belgrade Light-Contact gold medallist Klara Morton from Hungary took bronze.

Results

Key

See also
List of WAKO Amateur World Championships
List of WAKO Amateur European Championships
List of female kickboxers

References

External links
 WAKO World Association of Kickboxing Organizations Official Site

Kickboxing events at the WAKO World Championships 2007 Coimbra
2007 in kickboxing
Kickboxing in Portugal